"The Lord's Prayer" is a pop rock setting of the Lord's Prayer with music by Arnold Strals recorded in 1973 by the Australian nun Sister Janet Mead. Mead was known for pioneering the use of contemporary rock music in celebrating the Roman Catholic Mass and for her weekly radio programs.

The recording was produced by Martin Erdman and originally released by Festival Records in Australia. After reaching number three on the charts in Australia, it went on to become an international hit, selling nearly three million copies worldwide and making the upper reaches of the pop charts in countries as diverse as Canada, Japan, Brazil, Germany and the United States.

In the United States, "The Lord's Prayer" was picked up for American distribution by A&M Records (catalogue number 1491, b/w "Brother Sun and Sister Moon"). It was certified gold for sales of one million copies. The single entered the Billboard Hot 100 chart on 23 February 1974, charted for 13 weeks and reached a peak of No. 4 during Holy Week in April. The record also reached No. 2 on the Adult Contemporary singles chart. It made Mead the first Roman Catholic nun to have a hit record in the United States since Jeanine Deckers ("The Singing Nun"), hit No. 1 with "Dominique" in late 1963. It also became the only song to hit the Top 10 in which the entire lyrical content originated from the words of the Bible. More specifically, it is the only Top 10 hit with words attributed to Jesus Christ.

Accolades
Mead was nominated for a Grammy for Best Inspirational Performance (although she lost to Elvis Presley's How Great Thou Art) and also became the first Australian artist to sell one million US copies of a record produced in Australia. She donated all of her royalties from the recording's international sales to charity and her record label used their share of the proceeds to build a new state of the art recording studio.

Mead re-recorded "The Lord's Prayer" in 1999 for her album A Time to Sing.

Chart history

Weekly charts

Year-end charts

Sales certification

Cover versions
Johnny Mathis covered "The Lord's Prayer" in the style of Sister Janet Mead in 1980.  His version was a non-album track and was used as the B-side of his re-recording that year of "When a Child Is Born."

Popular culture
Mead's version was covered in the satirical stage musical Disaster!.

References

External link 
  [HQ Stereo] [1973]

1973 singles
Contemporary Christian songs
A&M Records singles
1973 songs
Festival Records singles